The South Irish Division, Royal Artillery, was an administrative grouping of garrison units of the Royal Artillery and Artillery Militia in Ireland from 1882 to 1889.

Organisation
Under General Order 72 of 4 April 1882 the Royal Artillery (RA) broke up its existing administrative brigades of garrison artillery (7th–11th Brigades, RA) and assigned the individual batteries to 11 new territorial divisions. These divisions were purely administrative and recruiting organisations, not field formations. For the first time the part-time Artillery Militia were associated with the regulars. The Regular Army batteries were grouped into one brigade, usually of nine sequentially-numbered batteries and a depot battery. For these units the divisions represented recruiting districts – batteries could be serving anywhere in the British Empire and their only connection to brigade headquarters (HQ) was for the supply of drafts and recruits. The artillery militia units (sometimes referred to as regiments) already comprised a number of batteries, and were redesignated as brigades, losing their county titles in the process.

Composition
South Irish Division, RA, listed as 11th in order of precedence, was organised with the following composition:

 HQ at Cork
 1st Brigade
 HQ at Kinsale
 1st Bty at Mount Wise, Devonport – formerly 12th Bty, 10th Bde
 2nd Bty at Plymouth – formerly 17th Bty, 11th Bde
 3rd Bty at Devonport – formerly 18th Bty, 11th Bde
 4th Bty at Portsmouth – formerly 11th Bty, 8th Bde
 5th Bty at Jutogh – formerly 11th Bty, 9th Bde
 6th Bty at Thayetmyo – formerly 11th Bty, 11th Bde
 7th Bty at Malta – formerly 2nd Bty, 11th Bde
 8th Bty at Malta – formerly 3rd Bty, 11th Bde
 9th Bty at Malta – formerly 4th Bty, 11th Bde
 Depot Bty at Kinsale – formerly Depot Bty, 10th Bde
 2nd Brigade at Macroom – formerly West Cork Artillery Militia (6 btys)
 3rd Brigade at Cork – formerly Royal Cork City Artillery Militia (4 btys)
 4th Brigade at Limerick – formerly Limerick City Artillery Militia (6 btys)
 5th Brigade at Clonmel – formerly South Tipperary Artillery Militia (8 btys)
 6th Brigade at Waterford – formerly Waterford Artillery Militia (8 btys)
 7th Brigade at Ennis – formerly 3rd Battalion, Royal Munster Fusiliers (8 btys)

Disbandment
On 1 July 1889 the garrison artillery was reorganised again into three large territorial divisions of garrison artillery (Eastern, Southern and Western) and one of mountain artillery. The assignment of units to them seemed geographically arbitrary, with all the Irish militia units being grouped in the Southern Division, for example, but this related to where the need for coastal artillery was greatest, rather than where the units recruited. The regular batteries were distributed across most of the divisions and completely renumbered.

See also
 Royal Garrison Artillery
 List of Royal Artillery Divisions 1882–1902
 North Irish Division, Royal Artillery
 Southern Division, Royal Artillery

Footnotes

Notes

References
 J.B.M. Frederick, Lineage Book of British Land Forces 1660–1978, Vol II, Wakefield: Microform Academic, 1984, ISBN 1-85117-009-X.
 Lt-Gen H.G. Hart, The New Annual Army List, Militia List, Yeomanry Cavalry List and Indian Civil Service List for 1884, London: John Murray, 1883.
 Lt-Gen H.G. Hart, The New Annual Army List, Militia List, Yeomanry Cavalry List and Indian Civil Service List for 1890, London: John Murray, 1889.
 Lt-Col M.E.S. Lawes, Battery Records of the Royal Artillery, 1859–1877, Woolwich: Royal Artillery Institution, 1970.
 Norman E.H. Litchfield, The Militia Artillery 1852–1909 (Their Lineage, Uniforms and Badges), Nottingham: Sherwood Press, 1987, ISBN 0-9508205-1-2.
 Col K. W. Maurice-Jones, The History of Coast Artillery in the British Army, London: Royal Artillery Institution, 1959/Uckfield: Naval & Military Press, 2005, ISBN 978-1-845740-31-3.
 War Office, Monthly Army List, London: HM Stationery Office, 1882–89.

Royal Artillery divisions
Military units and formations established in 1882
Military units and formations disestablished in 1889